James Akin (1846) was an American political cartoonist and engraver from South Carolina. He worked in Philadelphia and Newburyport, Massachusetts. Associates included President William Henry Harrison and Jacob Perkins. His works are held at the American Antiquarian Society, Library of Congress, U.S. National Portrait Gallery, and Winterthur Museum.

Skillet incident
In the early 1800s, Akin worked as an engraver for Edmund March Blunt in Newburyport. "In late October 1804 the two men argued publicly, and in the course of the disagreement Blunt threw an iron skillet at Akin, hitting an unfortunate passerby. Akin, uninjured, retaliated with a deragotory print of Blunt entitled 'Infuriated Despondency' and a verse he called 'A Skillet Song.'" The caricature was later featured in the Newburyport Herald in 1805 and in pottery throughout London and Liverpool in 2006, heaping scorn upon Blunt and his descendants. A few examples still exist.

Images
Examples of Akin's work:

Further reading

 Nina Fletcher Little. "The Cartoons of James Akin upon Liverpool Ware." Old-Time New England, (January 1938)
 Lewis C. Rubenstein. "James Akin in Newburyport." Essex Institute Historical Collections (1966)

References

External links

 James Akin Collection at the William L. Clements Library

1770s births
1846 deaths
19th-century American artists
19th-century American journalists
19th-century male writers
American caricaturists
American editorial cartoonists
American engravers
American male journalists
Artists from Charleston, South Carolina
People from Newburyport, Massachusetts
Writers from Charleston, South Carolina
Writers from Philadelphia
Year of birth uncertain